Razi Nurullayev (born 1 April 1971) is an Azerbaijani politician and political analyst is a Member of the National Assembly of Azerbaijan. He is a chairperson of the AXCP (Azerbaijan Popular Front Party - APFP) since 2015 (claim) and until then served as the deputy-chairperson for Foreign Affairs from 2009 to February 2015. Before being elected as a chairperson of APFP on 17 October 2015, he had established the New Democracy Movement on 14 April 2015, in Azerbaijan's capital, Baku. He has also been a head of “Region” International Analytical Centre (RIAC) since 2012, a Baku-based think-tank in Azerbaijan working on policy issues in Post-Soviet Space.

Early life 

Nurullayev was born on 1 April 1971 in Khalfali village of Imishli District in Azerbaijan SSR.

Education 

In 1978-1988 he received primary and secondary education at the school of Khalfali village of Imishli District.

In 1997 Razi Nurullayev graduated from Azerbaijan University of Languages from the faculty of English-French obtaining master's degree and in 2005 graduated from Southern Russian Humanitarian Institute’s Law Faculty. He also in 2009 received Ford Motor Company International Fellowship of the 92nd Street Y Developing Community Leaders at Columbia University in New York. In 2004 he got a scholarship to study International Human Rights Training Program (IHRTP) with Canadian Human Rights Foundation (now Equitas) at John Abbott College in Canada.

In 2002 – 2006 he served as a research fellow at the Institute of Philosophy, Political Science and Law Researches under Academy of Sciences of Azerbaijan at the department of “International Relations and International Law”.

He visited tens of countries across the world and spoke of democracy and activism in Azerbaijan.

Activity

In 90s Razi Nurullayev when he was a student started working in oil and other industrial companies such as Baku Steel Company, BUE Caspian Ltd. McDermott Marine Construction, Hyatt hotel, and several newspapers.

In February 2005 Razi Nurullayev formed Yox! Movement – Azerbaijan - aim was to say "YOX" (NO) to an anti-democratic thought and attitudes within the framework of democratic methods and law, contribute to the establishment of democracy in Azerbaijan, to give full freedom to the nation, and assist with its integration into the democratic world in quick steps in order to maintain the achieved victory. He was arrested for several times and in order to achieve the immunity he joined the parliamentary elections on the same year and pressures and falsifications kept him away from the parliamentary seat.

Since 2009 he is a deputy-chairperson for Foreign Affairs of Azerbaijan Popular Front Party (APFP) and head of “Region” International Analytical Centre (RIAC) since 2011.

Razi lectured English language grammar in 2001 – 2003 years at the Azerbaijan University of Languages.

In 2007 was elected a coordinator of Civil Society Coalition of Azerbaijani NGOs (later renamed to NGO Partnership Alliance, http://www.civil-soc.org/blog) uniting 50 NGOs now and expanding intensively. Since 2011 to 2013 served as Board member of the Alliance.

During 2001 – 2003 R.Nurullayev also worked as a country consultant in Azerbaijan of London-based International Alert.

In 2001-2002 was appointed an executive director of International Center for Caspian Studies based in Belgium.

Participation in elections

Later Razi Nurullayev also joined 2009 Municipal elections and 2010 parliamentary elections as s single candidate for the electoral constituency. Nevertheless, he won the elections, but again falsifications kept him outside the parliament, and the official results granted him a second place.

Academic work

Razi Nurullayev intensively writes blog posts and publishes articles in local newspapers. He was interviewed by several international editions as well and published several articles in international media.

He has also translated into Azerbaijani languages several books on non-violent action among which are “From Dictatorship to Democracy by Dr. Gene Sharp”; Elected Leadership series manual by UN-HABITAT’s Training and Capacity Building Branch; “There are Realistic Alternatives” by Dr. Gene Sharp, “On Strategic Non-violent Conflict; Thinking about the Fundamentals” by Robert Helvey, “Building Bridges between Local Governments and Citizens through Participatory Planning” by UN-HABITAT’s Training and Capacity Building Branch and several others.

Apart from his native Azerbaijani, he speaks Turkish, English, French and Russian.

References

External links
 Official blog
 
 
 
 

1971 births
Living people
Politicians from Baku
Azerbaijani democracy activists
Azerbaijan University of Languages alumni
Members of the National Assembly (Azerbaijan)